The 1979–80 Auburn Tigers men's basketball team represented Auburn University in the 1979-80 college basketball season. The team was coached by Sonny Smith, who was in his second season.

Newcomers to the team this season included freshman signees Darrell Lockhart, Frank Poindexter, Alvin Mumphord, and Byron Henson.

The team played their home games at Memorial Coliseum in Auburn, Alabama. They finished the season 10–18, 5–13 in SEC play. They defeated Georgia in the opening round of the SEC tournament, but lost to Kentucky in the next round.

Roster

References

Auburn Tigers men's basketball seasons
Auburn
Auburn Tigers
Auburn Tigers